George Craig JP EGS (1852-1927) was a Scottish architect and amateur geologist. He created a very high proportion of the 19th century public buildings in Leith.

Life

He was born on 17 January 1852. He was the son of George W. Craig, shipmaster (1827-1876) and his wife Marion Ramage.

In 1867 Craig was articled to the local Leith architect, James Simpson, to train as a draughtsman. In 1871 he decided to train further as an architect and attended classes both at the Edinburgh Royal Institution and the Leith School of Art. In the 1870s he worked as an assistant variously to Robert Rowand Anderson and John Lessels, before setting up his own practice around 1881.
In 1876 (independent of Anderson and Lessels) he received a major commission from the newly created Leith School Board to design all of Leith’s schools required to meet the requirements of the new Education Act (which required all children to be educated at state expense).

In 1885 he was styling himself “architect” without objection and running an office from 85 Constitution Street and living at 6 East Hermitage Place on Leith Links. In 1886, he relocated to 3 Bernard Street.
He was not admitted into the RIBA until 1911, aged 59.

He died on 27 March 1927. He is buried under a monument which he erected to his father, almost certainly to his own design, in Rosebank Cemetery in northern Edinburgh. The grave lies on the main east-west path, roughly opposite the distinctive grave of Christian Salvesen.

Publications

Building Stones used in Edinburgh (1892)

Family

He was married to Annie Blackie (1851-1957) who died at the very advanced age of 105.

Works

Leith Swimming Pool (Victoria Baths) Great Junction Street
Lochend Road School, Leith (1885)
Large warehouse on Pattison Street, Leith (1887/8)
Trafalgar Masonic Lodge, Leith (1888)
Yardheads School, Leith (1888) demolished
Couper Street School, Leith (1889) demolished 1988
Rear extension to Dr Bell’s School, Great Junction Street, Leith (1890) front by R & R Dickson
Craighall Road School (1891) later renamed Trinity Academy
Rebuilding of parish church, Skirling, Scottish Borders (1893)
Shop for William Nimmo & Co 46 Constitution Street, Leith (1894) now the Rocksalt Cafe
Remodelling of the Turkish baths on Casselbank Street off Leith Walk (1894) now the Destiny Church
Leith Academy Primary School (1896)
Victoria Primary School, Newhaven, Edinburgh (1896)
Tantallon Hall, North Berwick (1907)
Strathmiglo United Free Church and church hall (1912)
David Kilpatrick School, North Junction Street, Leith (1913) demolished
Gymnasium block, Leith Academy (1920)

References

1852 births
1927 deaths
Amateur geologists
Architects from Edinburgh
Scottish geologists
Scottish non-fiction writers
People from Leith
Scientists from Edinburgh